North Secretary Island is located in the Gulf Islands where Trincomali Channel and Houstoun Passage meet in the Gulf Islands region of the South Coast of British Columbia, Canada. There are two islands in the Secretary Islands group, the southern being named South Secretary and the larger one being named  North Secretary Island. There is another Secretary Island in British Columbia, in Sooke Basin.

The Secretary Islands were named in 1859 by Captain Richards, RN, after J.L. Southey, RN, secretary to Rear Admiral Baynes, commander-in-chief of the Pacific Station, 1857–60, on account of their proximity to Southey Point, which is the northern tip of Saltspring Island.

North Secretary Island is currently owned by a group of private owners from across British Columbia.

See also
Secretary Island (New Zealand)

References

 

Islands of the Gulf Islands
Islands of British Columbia